A hoodie (in some cases spelled hoody and alternatively known as a hooded sweatshirt) is a sweatshirt with a hood. Hoodies with zippers usually include two pockets on the lower front, one on either side of the zipper, while "pullover" hoodies (without zippers) often include a single large muff or pocket in the same location. Both styles (usually) include a drawstring to adjust the hood opening. When worn up, the hood covers most of the head and neck and sometimes the face. Hoodies may be worn for aesthetic purposes, or protection against the environment (cold weather, rain, etc.)

History

The word hood derives from the Anglo-Saxon word hōd, ultimately of the same root as an English hat. The garment's style and form can be traced back to Medieval Europe when the preferred clothing for monks included a hood called a cowl attached to a tunic or robes, and a chaperon or hooded cape was very commonly worn by any outdoors worker. Its appearance was known in England at least as early as the 12th century, possibly an import with the Norman conquest of England, as the capa was "a short hooded cloak which was common in Normandy."

The hooded pullover is a utilitarian garment that originated in the 1930s in the US for workers in cold New York warehouses. The earliest clothing style was first produced by Champion in the 1930s in Rochester and marketed to laborers working in freezing temperatures in upstate New York. The term hoodie entered popular usage in the 1990s.

The hoodie became popular in the 1970s, with several factors contributing to its success. Hip hop culture developed in New York City around this time and high fashion also took off during this era, as Norma Kamali and other high-profile designers embraced and glamorized the new clothing. Most critical to the hoodie's popularity during this time was its iconic appearance in the blockbuster Rocky film. The rise of hoodies with university logos began around this time.

By the 1990s, the hoodie had evolved into a symbol of isolation, a statement of academic spirit, and several fashion collections. The association with chavs or neds in the UK developed around this time, as their popularity rose with that specific demographic. Young men, often skateboarders or surfers, sported the hoodie and spread the trend across the western part of the United States, most significantly in California. Tommy Hilfiger, Giorgio Armani, and Ralph Lauren, for example, used the hoodie as the primary component for many of their collections in the 1990s. A crystal-studded hoodie made by rapper Sean "Diddy" Combs was acquired by the Victoria & Albert Museum in London.

Australia

In June 2011, police in Wynnum, Brisbane, launched a "Hoodie Free Zone" initiative, with shopkeepers encouraged to ask hoodie-wearers to leave. The zone is part of an initiative to educate businesses on how they can avoid armed robberies, in which the hoodie type of clothing is reportedly often worn.

Canada
Across Canada, hoodies are a popular clothing item sometimes worn under a coat or jacket to provide an extra layer of clothing during the winter. In the province of Saskatchewan, hoodies without zippers are "bunny hugs."

Prior to the name Bunny Hug, they were called Kangaroos in Saskatchewan.

New Zealand
The "Hoodies on Parliament—politicians challenge youth stereotypes" campaign was launched in May 2008 in New Zealand (NZ) as part of the annual national Youth Week event, a pro-youth initiative organized to challenge youth stereotypes. To launch the campaign, NZ politicians, including National MP Nicky Wagner, Green Party MPs Sue Bradford, Nandor Tanczos and Metiria Turei, and Maori party MP Hone Harawira, wore hoodies while standing on the steps of the country's parliament. Archbishop David Moxon, Archbishop of the Anglican Dioceses, and Brian Turner President of the Methodist Church of NZ also participated in the campaign.

Support and criticism were raised by politicians, who were divided over the 2008 event. One strong response was drawn from a local government council member, Dale Evans, who donned a Ku Klux Klan outfit in protest, citing the hoodie as "not an appropriate article of clothing to celebrate."

"Goodie in a Hoodie" day was then run in 2009 by New Zealand Adolescent Health and Development (NZAAHD) in partnership with Age Concern—the organisations used the campaign to highlight the stereotypes that both young people and the elderly face in New Zealand. Liz Baxendine, president of Age Concern at the time, said to the media:

Older people and young people have a lot in common. We both face stereotypes based on our age rather than our real achievements and outlook on life ... we've got to destigmatise the hoodie and see it for what it is. Everyone wears them. We need to take the hoodie back!

United Kingdom

In the UK, hoodies have been the subject of much criticism; some shoplifters have used the hood to conceal their identities from CCTV cameras in shopping centres. The hoodie became a popular clothing item by the 1990s. By the 21st century, it had gained a negative image, being associated with trouble-making, intimidating  teens and anti-social behaviour. It became one of the later items associated with "chavs", or Neds.

Angela McRobbie, professor of communications at Goldsmiths College in the UK, says the appeal of the hoodie is its promise of anonymity, mystery and anxiety. "The point of origin is obviously black American hip-hop culture, now thoroughly mainstream and a key part of the global economy. Leisure and sportswear adopted for everyday wear suggests a distance from the world of office suit or school uniform. Rap culture celebrates defiance, as it narrates the experience of social exclusion. Musically and stylistically, it projects menace and danger as well as anger and rage. The hooded top is one in a long line of garments chosen by young people, usually boys, to which are ascribed meanings suggesting that they are 'up to no good'. In the past, such appropriation was usually restricted to membership of specific youth cultures—leather jackets, bondage trousers—but nowadays it is the norm among young people to flag up their music and cultural preferences in this way, hence the adoption of the hoodie by boys across the boundaries of age, ethnicity and class."

In May 2005, Bluewater shopping centre in Kent caused outrage by launching a code of conduct which bans its shoppers from sporting hoodies or baseball caps, although the garments remain on sale. John Prescott welcomed the move, stating that he was threatened by the presence of teenagers wearing hoodies at a motorway service station. Then-Prime Minister Tony Blair openly supported this stance and vowed to clamp down on the anti-social behaviour with which hoodie-wearers are sometimes associated. London-based rapper Lady Sovereign published a single titled "Hoodie" in protest as part of a "Save the Hoodie" campaign.

In 2005, Coombeshead College in the south-west of England allowed the hoodie to become part of the boys' school uniform, but the hood could be put up only when it rained. The principal, Richard Haigh, stated that the move would help to calm some of what he called the "hysteria" surrounding the garment.

The JCB Academy allows hoodies, but only a navy blue type sold in the school shop.

In February 2006, a 58-year-old teacher who was wearing a hooded top was asked to remove it when entering a Tesco store in Swindon. According to the teacher, she was wearing the hood because "my hair's a mess". The store did not have a hoodie policy. The shop apologized and said it was taking action to "make sure this doesn't happen again."

In July 2006, David Cameron, leader of the Conservative Party, made a speech suggesting that the hoodie was worn more for defensive than offensive purposes. The speech was referred to as "hug a hoodie" by the Labour Party.

In 2019 the British fashion label Burberry had to apologize for an inappropriate hoodie. On its runaway show, the fashion label featured a piece of cloth with a "noose" around the neck, which caused an outrageous reaction in social media.

A March 2020 article in the Belfast Telegraph argued that hoodies were not as associated with the working class as in previous years, noting that Kate Middleton had appeared in a hoodie.

United States
Hoodies have become a mainstream fashion in the U.S., transcending the clothing item's original utilitarian purpose, similar to jeans. This clothing item has found its way into a variety of styles, even so far as to be worn under a suit jacket. Hoodies with zippers are generally referred to as zip-up hoodies, while a hoodie without a zipper may be described as a pullover hoodie. Throughout the U.S., it is common for teenagers and young adults to wear sweatshirts—with or without hoods—that display their respective school names or mascots across the chest, either as part of a uniform or personal preference.

The hooded sweatshirt is a utilitarian garment that originated in the 1930s for workers in cold New York warehouses and thus have been around for over 80 years. In the 70s and 80s, hoodies were adopted by hip hop culture as a symbol of what one reporter termed "cool anonymity and vague menace" When the garment was depicted in FBI composite drawings of Unabomber Ted Kaczynski, the hoodie became linked to "seedy threatening criminality," thereby further asserting its non-mainstream symbolism.

In 2012 Trayvon Martin was shot by George Zimmerman while wearing a hoodie, and protests over his death involved hoodies. Fox News host Geraldo Rivera encouraged young black people to stop wearing hoodies though he later apologized for his comments. Zimmerman's defense team offered what was called "the hoodie defense". They argued that it was reasonable for Zimmerman to regard Martin's hoodie as a threat.  According to Carolyn Fluehr-Lobban, author of Race and Racism, following Zimmerman's trial the garment became emblematic of the Black Lives Matter movement. Dress Codes author, law Professor Richard Thompson Ford, said that "As the hoodie became associated with 'Black hoodlums' in the media, some Black people avoided them and others embraced them: the public image of the hoodie made it into a statement of racial pride and defiance, solidarity with a community, an emblem of belonging, and all of that reinforced the negative associations for those who were inclined to be afraid of assertive Black people."

Facebook CEO Mark Zuckerberg often wears a plain grey zip-up hoodie rather than a business suit, drawing comments during his company's 2012 initial public offering. Actor Jesse Eisenberg dons the same attire while portraying Zuckerberg in the 2010 film The Social Network.

In 2015, Oklahoma state representative Don Barrington proposed a bill to criminalize wearing a "robe, mask or other disguise" in public that would "intentionally conceal the wearer's identity", a bill which was criticized as an attempt to criminalize the wearing of the hoodie.

See also

 Baja jacket
 Cardigan (sweater)
 Goggle jacket
 Parka

References

Tops (clothing)
Hip hop fashion
20th-century fashion
21st-century fashion